Caladenia pachychila, commonly known as the dwarf zebra orchid, is a species of orchid endemic to the south-west of Western Australia. It has a single erect, hairy leaf and one or two greenish-yellow and red flowers with a red-striped labellum which has a dense cluster of deep purple calli in its centre. It is similar to the zabra orchid (Caladenia cairnsiana) but has smaller flowers and the lateral sepals do not clasp the ovary.

Description 
Caladenia pachychila is a terrestrial, perennial, deciduous, herb with an underground tuber and which often grows in clumps. The sides of the labellum lack teeth but are rolled under and the tip has a thickened, red, V-shaped glandular tip and is curled under. There is a dense cluster of purplish-red calli in centre of the labellum. Flowering occurs from July to September.

Taxonomy and naming 
Caladenia pachychila was first described in 2001 by Stephen Hopper and Andrew Phillip Brown from a specimen collected near Salmon Gums and the description was published in Nuytsia. The specific epithet (pachychila) is derived from the Ancient Greek words pachys meaning "thick" and cheilos meaning "lip" or "rim" referring to the thickened tip of the labellum.

Distribution and habitat 
The dwarf zebra orchid is widely distributed between Kalbarri and Mount Ragged in the Cape Arid National Park. It grows in shrubland and mallee woodland, especially on rocky hills.

Conservation
Caladenia pachychila is classified as "not threatened" by the Western Australian Government Department of Parks and Wildlife.

References 

pachychila
Orchids of Western Australia
Endemic orchids of Australia
Plants described in 2001
Endemic flora of Western Australia
Taxa named by Stephen Hopper
Taxa named by Andrew Phillip Brown